Altshausen is a small Swabian municipality with around 4,100 inhabitants, near the city of Ravensburg in Baden-Württemberg, in southern Germany.

Geography 
Altshausen is situated in Upper Swabia, about 40 kilometers north of Lake Constance. North-west of the village is the Upper Danube Nature Park while to the South-west is the hill-chain of the Altdorfer Wald.

Main sights
It is notable for its Teutonic Order castle and as the birthplace of Hermann of Reichenau. In the center of the town there is the Altshausen Schloss, which is the main palace still owned by the House of Württemberg.

Sightseeing 
Altshausen is part of the Upper Swabian Baroque Route, a tourist road from the Swabian Alps to Upper Swabia. On both routes the tourists can visit many monuments and points of view.

Transport

Altshausen is located at the Herbertingen-Aulendorf railway.

Sister cities
 Bicske, Hungary
 Sausset-les-Pins, France (a city near Marseille)

References

External links

 

Ravensburg (district)
Burial sites of the House of Saxe-Coburg and Gotha (Bulgaria)